Stan Against Evil is an American comedy horror television series created by Dana Gould. The series stars John C. McGinley, Janet Varney, Nate Mooney, and Deborah Baker Jr. The series premiered on IFC on October 31, 2016. Season two aired during November 2017 and season three in October and November 2018. On January 25, 2019, series creator Dana Gould announced IFC had officially cancelled the series.

Premise
A New Hampshire town built on the site of a massive witch burning is haunted by demons, spirits, and witches, that all hate the authorities responsible for their demise, and those of their ilk. Stan Miller, the crotchety former sheriff, teams up with his replacement, Evie Barrett to defend the town from the supernatural.

Cast and characters

Main
John C. McGinley as Stanley Miller, the former sheriff who is forced to resign after a violent outburst at his wife's funeral 
Janet Varney as Evie Barret, the new sheriff of the town and a single mom
Nate Mooney as Deputy Leon Drinkwater 
Deborah Baker Jr. as Denise Miller, Stan's daughter

Recurring 
Morgana Ignis as Stella Stanas, The Baphomet, Ida Putnam, Haurus, Aged Priscilla
Danielle Phelan as Karen
Denise Boutte as Lara Bouchard
Dana Gould as Kevin, the gravedigger
Randall Newsome as Constable Eccles
Grace DeAmicis as Grace, Evie's daughter

Episodes

Season 1 (2016)

Season 2 (2017)

Season 3 (2018)

Production
On February 22, 2016, the series was picked up for an eight episode first season, which began filming in June 2016 in Atlanta, and premiered on October 31, 2016, on IFC. On December 13, 2016, IFC renewed the series for a second season, which premiered on November 1, 2017. In January 2018, it was announced that IFC had renewed the series for a third season. The third season premiered on October 31, 2018.

Reception
On Rotten Tomatoes the first season has a 67% approval rating with an average rating of 5.24/10 based on 12 reviews. The site's critical consensus reads: "Stan Against Evil is a light, gruesome horror-comedy with a fun premise, but the series has yet to solidify its tone and characters." On Metacritic, the first season has a score of 57 out of 100, based on 8 critics, indicating "mixed or average reviews".

References

External links
 
 

2016 American television series debuts
2018 American television series endings
2010s American horror comedy television series
2010s American supernatural television series
Demons in television
English-language television shows
IFC (American TV channel) original programming
Television shows filmed in Atlanta
Television shows set in New Hampshire
Witchcraft in television